Achthophora is a genus of longhorn beetles of the subfamily Lamiinae, containing the following species:

 Achthophora alma Newman, 1842
 Achthophora annulicornis Heller, 1924
 Achthophora costulata Heller, 1923
 Achthophora ferruginea Heller, 1924
 Achthophora humeralis (Heller, 1916)
 Achthophora lumawigi Breuning, 1980
 Achthophora sandakana Heller, 1924
 Achthophora trifasciata Heller, 1924
 Achthophora tristis Newman, 1842

References

Lamiini
Cerambycidae genera